The Hughes breech-loading cannon 38.1mm gun was designed in 1861 and used by the Confederate States of America during the American Civil War. It was manufactured by the Street & Hungerford Company. It was a breech-loading cannon; the breech of the cannon is uniquely like a bolt-action but has no firing pin in its bolt.

See also
 Rifled breech loader

Cannon
Weapons of the Confederate States of America
Field artillery of the Confederate States of America